Giovanni Lorenzo can refer to:

 Gian Lorenzo Bernini (1598–1680), Italian sculptor
 Giovanni Lorenzo Berti (1696–1766), Italian Augustinian theologian
 Giovanni Lorenzo Bertolotti (1640–1721), Italian painter of the Baroque period
 Giovanni Lorenzo Lulier (–1700), Baroque Italian composer

See also
 Giovanni di Lorenzo
 Giovanni Di Lorenzo (born 1993), Italian footballer
 Giovanni Lorenzo (boxer) (born 1980), Dominican boxer